Bajrang Kumar Choudhary serves as the Managing Director of Bharat Road Network Limited. He has been the Chief Executive Officer of Infrastructure Project Development for Srei Infrastructure Finance Limited  and served as its Senior Vice President in Managing Director's Secretariat. He is also on the Board of several other companies such as Kolkata Mass Rapid Transit Private Limited, Bharat Road Network Limited, AMRL Hitech City Limited, Hyderabad Information Technology Venture Enterprises Limited, I Log Ports Private Limited  among others.

In 2015, he was also featured as "Most Powerful, Successful People in the Indian Construction Industry" by Construction Sphere.

Personal life
Bajrang Choudhary was born on 22 June 1968 in Hiranpur, Jharkhand and is the youngest son of Late Hari Prasad Choudhary and Gita Devi.

Education
Bajrang is an alumnus of Delhi Public School, Mathura Road, New Delhi and a Bachelor of Commerce from Shri Ram College of Commerce, New Delhi.

Career
He started his career with PricewaterhouseCoopers and was associated with them for 4 years. He traveled extensively to USA and other parts of the world during his tenure with PwC. He then moved on to Apeejay Surrendra Group for over six years in multiple roles as Director, Chief Financial Officer and Chief Executive Officer in their various group companies.

At Srei, he manages portfolio investment across the infrastructure sector – roads, ports, airports, water and economic zones.

Affiliations
Bajrang has been associated with various industry associations and company boards. He is currently the Chairman of ICC Infrastructure Expert Committee.

References

External links
Srei Website
BRNL Website

1968 births
Living people
Businesspeople from Kolkata
People from Pakur district